Lophocampa significans is a moth of the subfamily Arctiinae. It was described by Henry Edwards in 1888. It is found in the United States in New Mexico, Arizona, Colorado, Kansas, Utah and Wyoming.

References

 Natural History Museum Lepidoptera generic names catalog

significans
Moths described in 1888